Rola El Haress (born March 5, 1983) is a Lebanese former swimmer, who specialized in sprint freestyle events. El Haress competed for Lebanon in the women's 100 m freestyle at the 2000 Summer Olympics in Sydney. She received a ticket from FINA, under a Universality program, in an entry time of 1:00.00. She challenged seven other swimmers in heat one, including 15-year-olds Maria Awori of Kenya and Nathalie Lee Baw of Mauritius. She raced to the second seed in a time of 1:03.26, more than three seconds outside her personal best. El Haress failed to advance into the semifinals, as she placed forty-eighth overall in the prelims.

References

1983 births
Living people
Lebanese female swimmers
Olympic swimmers of Lebanon
Swimmers at the 2000 Summer Olympics
Lebanese female freestyle swimmers
Sportspeople from Beirut